Yaşar Mumcuoğlu (born 15 November 1942) is a Turkish footballer. He played in five matches for the Turkey national football team from 1965 to 1970.

References

1942 births
Living people
Turkish footballers
Turkey international footballers
Place of birth missing (living people)
Association footballers not categorized by position